The Pill is a 2011 American romantic comedy film starring Rachel Boston and Noah Bean.

Plot
Mindy (Rachel Boston), a young, single woman living in New York City meets Fred (Noah Bean); the two soon after embark on an evening of unprotected sex. The following day, Fred panics after he discovers Mindy's not using contraception. The plot begins when he insists that she use emergency contraception, to which she obliges. Soon after, Fred breaks it off only to realize that the process will require taking two pills. Fred spends the day with Mindy to ensure she takes the second pill and in the process gets to know her better. When Mindy finds out that Fred has a live-in girlfriend, she takes the second pill and breaks it off. The film ends when weeks later they both meet up again. By then, Fred has broken up with his girlfriend and they seem to give it a new start.

Awards 
 Dances With Films (2011)
 Honorable Mention
 Gen Art Film Festival (2011)
 Audience Award
 Stargazer Award
 San Diego Film Festival (2011)
 Best Actress (Rachel Boston)

Reception
The film received mostly positive reviews from critics. The film holds a 70% fresh rating on Rotten Tomatoes which gives the film a "Certified Fresh" rating with a score of 70% based on reviews from 10 critics.

References

External links

2011 films
American romantic comedy films
2011 romantic comedy films
2010s English-language films
2010s American films